Rhyacionia adana, the Adana tip moth, is a moth of the family Tortricidae. It is found in north-eastern North America, including Massachusetts, Pennsylvania, Virginia, Michigan, Wisconsin and Ontario.

The wingspan is about 17 mm. There is one generation per year.

The larvae feed on various pine species. The larvae mine the current year's shoots of red, jack and Scots pine seedlings and saplings (it attacks the lower halves of trees up to 25 feet tall). Serious damage has been recorded in red and Scots pine plantations in Massachusetts, Pennsylvania, Virginia, Michigan, Wisconsin, and Ontario.

The female lays her eggs between needles just above the sheath of the needle fascicle. Newly hatched larvae spin silken cases between two old needles just above the needle sheath. They then enter the needles and mine toward the tip. After new needle growth has started, larvae enter and mine developing shoots. Several larvae may inhabit a single shoot, moving toward the buds and causing shoot death. In mid-June to late July, mature larvae move down the main stem of the tree and pupate in cocoons cemented to the stem just below the soil surface. Shoot death becomes apparent after the insect has pupated.

External links
 bugwood.org
 Images
 Bug Guide

Olethreutinae
Moths described in 1923
Moths of North America